The 2022 WAFL Women's season was the fourth season of the WAFL Women's (WAFLW). The season commenced on 19 February and concluded with the Grand Final on 2 July 2022. West Perth made their debut in the competition, increasing the league's size to seven clubs. Claremont won the premiership, and defeated East Fremantle by 8 points in the grand final.

Clubs

Ladder

Finals series

Semi-finals

Preliminary final

Grand Final

Awards
 Dhara Kerr Award
 Sharon Wong (East Fremantle)

 WAFLW Joanne Huggins Leading Goal Kicker Award
 Kate Bartlett (Peel Thunder)

 WAFLW Cath Boyce Rookie of the Year Award
 Julia Teakle (East Fremantle)

 Coach of the Year
 Matthew Templeton (East Fremantle)

 Rogers Cup Fairest and Best
 Mia Russo (West Perth)

 Rogers Cup Leading Goal Kicker
 Carys D'Addario (Swan Districts)

 Rogers Cup Rising Star
 Mia Russo (West Perth)

 Reserves Premiers
 Claremont Football Club

 Reserves Fairest and Best
 Amber Ugle-Hayward (Swan Districts)
Reserves Leading Goal Kicker
 Jessie McDonald (East Fremantle)

References

 
W